Arianna Schivo (born 16 September 1986) is an Italian Olympic eventing rider. She competed at the 2016 Summer Olympics in Rio de Janeiro where she finished 34th in the individual and 9th in the team competition.

Schivo also participated at the 2015 European Eventing Championships, where she placed 6th with the Italian team in the team event and finished 28th individually.

Her father Gian Marco Schivo was a finalist in the high jump competition at the 1972 Summer Olympics.

References

External links
 

Living people
1986 births
Italian female equestrians
Italian event riders
Equestrians at the 2016 Summer Olympics
Olympic equestrians of Italy
Equestrians at the 2020 Summer Olympics